Chory is a surname and given name. Notable people with the name include:

Chory Castro (born 1984), Uruguayan football player
Joanne Chory, American plant biologist and geneticist
Tomáš Chorý (born 1995), Czech football player

See also
Chori (disambiguation)